Moosbrugger can refer to:

 Alexander Moosbrugger, Austrian composer
 Frederick Moosbrugger, United States vice-admiral
 Friedrich Mosbrugger, German painter (also spelled Moosbrugger)
 Wendelin Moosbrugger, Austrian painter, father of Friedrich
 Moosbrugger (no first name), a character in The Man Without Qualities by Robert Musil
 USS Moosbrugger (DD-980), a destroyer named after Frederick